The New Zealand DI class locomotive was a class of diesel-electric locomotive in New Zealand. They were built by English Electric at their plant in Rocklea, Queensland in Australia. The class is very similar to the Queensland Railways 1620 class locomotives. At the time of their introduction, the class was seen as an alternative to the DB class for use on lightly laid secondary and branch lines, more so in the South Island. The World Bank financed introduction of the Japanese built DJ class in 1968, which ensured that no further DI class locomotives were purchased by New Zealand Railways.

History

The DI class were an evolution of the Queensland Railways 1600 class built by English Electric at their Rocklea, Queensland plant. The DI class featured an American-style high front hood. Queensland Railways (QR) took an interest in the NZR design and were impressed by the characteristics of the locomotives. Like NZR, QR was in the process of phasing out steam locomotives, and like NZR required a diesel locomotive able to operate on lightly-laid branch lines. QR placed an order with English Electric for locomotives that would be based on the features of the DI class, which would become Queensland Railways 1620 class.

Service 
Three members of the class originally operated in the South Island, mainly on the Main North Line between Christchurch and Picton, while the other two members started life in the upper North Island. In May 1969, all members were transferred to work in the Bay of Plenty area on the lightly laid track there. 

After the Kaimai Tunnel opened in 1978, all five members were transferred to the South Island for service in the Dunedin area. The class performed sterling service on the hilly Dunedin - Palmerston section of the Main South Line, and were also used to haul the Makareao branchline stone trains to Makareao due to their full adhesion Co-Co wheelset arrangement. Members of the class occasionally made trips to Invercargill and were sometimes used on the Otago Central Line.

Renumbering 
In 1979, the computerised Traffic Monitoring System (TMS) was introduced, and the locomotives were renumbered as 1808, 1844, 1820, 1837 and 1843 respectively.

South Island 
They remained in Dunedin until 1984 - 1986, when they went north to Wellington and Napier mainly being used for shunting duties. The locomotives were also used on revenue and special passenger services over the years of their operation.

Disposal

Withdrawals 
The first withdrawn from service was DI 1837 in January 1986 due to a fractured piston that had caused major engine damage, moving to Hutt Workshops late February 1987 for storage. 1808 and 1814 were then laid up in April 1988. DI 1843 was withdrawn in May 1988 after a collision with a milk tanker truck in a level crossing accident near Otaki. 1808 was subsequently returned to service to replace 1843, until it suffered a major main generator failure in April 1989. The remaining member of the class in service, 1820, was withdrawn in May 1989. DIs 1814, 1837 and 1843 were scrapped at Hutt Workshops in March 1989, while 1808 was stripped of useful components in May 1991 by the Diesel Traction Group for spares for 1820.

Preservation 

DI1820 was purchased by the Diesel Traction Group in 1989, and transferred to their base at the Ferrymead Heritage Park in September 1992. The locomotive was restored from 2009 to 2018, and has since been renumbered back to DI 1102. It was mainline certified in September 2018.

References

Footnotes

Citations

Bibliography

External links
 Queensland Rail 1620 Class
 Diesel Traction Group, Christchurch
 General Arrangement

DI class
Co-Co locomotives
English Electric locomotives
Railway locomotives introduced in 1966